Fordsburg is a suburb of Johannesburg, South Africa. It is located in Region 8.   Fordsburg is a residential suburb, although housing numerous shops and factories.

Today, Fordsburg is a major centre of Indian and Pakistani culture, with a large number of halal restaurants. The Oriental Plaza, located in Fordsburg, was created by the Apartheid government as a large shopping centre for Indian-owned shops, and is a major attraction in Fordsburg. The suburb was portrayed in the 2012 film Material, which highlighted some of the cultural, racial and religious issues still facing South Africa's post-apartheid society

From the earliest days of Johannesburg, the suburb housed a large Jewish community - with the Fordsburg/Mayfair Hebrew Congregation established in 1893  - as well as associated institutions such as a Kosher butchery, chevra kadisha, welfare organisations and Bet midrash.

1922 Miner's strike 

Fordsburg was the site of a miners strike by Afrikaner nationalists and many Communists.  Mine bosses insisted on using African labour in the mines. White workers opposed this policy, and Smuts called in the troops and airforce. This strike is also known as the Rand Rebellion. A plaque in Fordsburg Square records the people who were killed there in the last battle of the rebellion.

Writer Herman Charles Bosman and playwright Athol Fugard, as well as anti-apartheid activists such as Yusuf Dadoo, GM Naiker and Nelson Mandela spent time in Fordsburg.

References

External links
A history and overview of Johannesburg's western inner city, including Fordsburg

Ethnic enclaves in South Africa
Indian diaspora in South Africa
Islam in South Africa
Jews and Judaism in Johannesburg
Johannesburg Region F
Pakistani diaspora in Africa